The Canadian International School of Beijing (CISB) is a Canadian international school in Chaoyang District, Beijing.

CISB was founded in 2005. The school was established as a State Level Project through the Chinese Ministry of Foreign Affairs and Education, the Government of Canada, and the New Brunswick Department of Education.

CISB has students from over 70 countries.

CISB operates under the guidance of the New Brunswick, Canada, Department of Education. The founding organization of CISB has a history of operating schools in China with three other schools in China, including International School of Nanshan Shenzhen, and two schools delivering the Canadian Curriculum to Chinese Nationals in both Beijing and Shenzhen.

CISB offers a facility with a Canadian education curriculum. The grade levels at CISB range from Montessori Preschool to Grade 12.

The Canadian International School of Beijing is a 3 programme IB World School and offers the International Baccalaureate Primary Years Programme (PYP), Middle Years Programme (MYP) and Diploma Programme (IBDP/DP).

Operations
In 2015 the tuition for the year was 170,000 renminbi ($27,387 U.S. dollars). China Daily ranked CISB as the 9th most expensive private school in Beijing.

Curriculum
CISB offers a Montessori Kindergarten from 18 months to 3 years old and an internationally recognized Canadian curriculum through an agreement with the New Brunswick, Canada, Department of Education.

In the early years, the curriculum provides an emphasis on the skills, knowledge, and attitudes students will need for later success. As the students progress into Middle School, the subject areas broaden to provide them with experiences in specific curriculum areas and to introduce new interests. In High School, the program begins to become more focused as we prepare students to meet the requirements for university entrance.

In addition, CISB is a 3 programme IB World School offering the International Baccalaureate PYP, MYP and Diploma Programmes.

Accreditation
All certificates and diplomas issued for student achievement are recognized by the New Brunswick, Canada, Department of Education.

The school is affiliated with UNESCO and ACAMIS.

Sports and activities

CISB Bobcats compete in sports competitions as part of the ACAMIS and ISAC Leagues. CISB Bobcats teams include basketball, soccer, softball, volleyball, badminton, table tennis, cheerleading, speed stacking and track and field.

Clubs and activities at CISB include language clubs, drama, choir, bands, newspaper, yearbook, social committee, and global issue network.

Facilities
The school is located in the third Embassy compound in the Chaoyang District of Beijing.
 90 classrooms equipped with Smart Board technology
 Media labs
 2 libraries
 1 Science laboratories
 Technology laboratory
 Visual Arts classrooms
 Display area for Fine Arts
 Lecture theater
 Auditorium with a 500 seats capacity for major productions and meetings
 2 gymnasiums
 25 meter swimming pool
 Wading pool for young children
 Supervised outdoor children's playground
 Dance studio
 4 piano practice rooms
 2 music classrooms equipped with 50 keyboards
 Multipurpose room
 Weight/workout room
 Outdoor short track
 Soccer field
 Full-service cafeteria and a smaller food service area
 Medical/dental clinic
 Workshop equipped with construction materials and appliances

See also
 Canadians in China

References

External links
 Canadian International School of Beijing website
 Canadian International School of Beijing - International Baccalaureate Organisation
 "Multiculturalism at Canadian International School of Beijing" (Archive). China Daily. 23 May 2007 page 13.

International Baccalaureate schools in China
Private schools in China
International schools in Beijing
High schools in Beijing
Beijing
Association of China and Mongolia International Schools